Insane ("Come to see Me") is a 2016 South Korean mystery thriller film directed by Lee Cheol-ha. It was released in South Korea on April 7, 2016.

Plot
During the day and in the middle of taking a walk downtown, Kang Soo-Ah (Kang Ye-won) is taken away against her will and brought to a psychiatric hospital, where she is locked up. The people working there refuse to answer her questions about why she was taken away, and is given "medication" drugs. If she refuses to take them or fight back, she finds that they will physically harm her in response. While pretending to be okay with everything terrible that is done to her, Soo-Ah begins to secretly write down in detail all of the horrific acts that take place at the psychiatric hospital in a journal she finds.

One year later, Na Nam-Soo (Lee Sang-yoon) is working as a programming director for the same broadcasting station he was suspended from in the previous year. He is assigned to a project to discover what really happened to the psychiatric hospital, which recently burned down in a fire. He finds the notebook belonging to Soo-Ah, but cannot find anything about the fire; to uncover the truth, Nam-Soo seeks out Soo-Ah, who is now in prison as a murder suspect.

Cast
Kang Ye-won as Kang Soo-ah 
Lee Sang-yoon as Na Nam-soo 
Choi Jin-ho as Jang Hyung-sik
Ji Dae-han as Kang Byung-joo
Chun Min-hee as Mi-ro
Lee Hak-joo as Dong-sik
Choi Yoon-so as Ji-young
Jo Jae-yoon as Detective Park
Gu Won as Woo-sub
Kim Jong-soo as Detective Cha
Jang Tae-seong as Depeartment Head Koo
Yoo Gun as Lee Woo-jin
Jeon Kwang-jin as death angel
Kim Ho-won as emergency room doctor
Ahn Ji-hye as Yeo-kyung
Park Se-jin as prison doctor
Kim Hyun as patient's family member
Gil Hae-yeon as Kang Soo-ah's mother

Reception

Awards and nominations

References

External links

2016 thriller films
South Korean thriller films
Films directed by Lee Cheol-ha
2010s South Korean films
2010s Korean-language films